David Kenneth Irving is an American film director, screenwriter, author, and professor.  His accolades include the 1981 Writers Guild of America Award for Television: Children's Script.

Early life 
Irving was born in Santa Clara County, California. He is the son of Jules Irving and Priscilla Pointer. His father is of Russian-Jewish descent. He has two siblings, actress Amy Irving and Katie Irving. He spent his childhood in San Francisco, where he was active in local theater. The family then relocated to New York City. Irving attended high school at Riverdale School for Boys. He earned a BFA from Denison University and an MFA from California Institute of the Arts.

Career 
Irving began his career as a screenwriter, director and producer of movies. He also directed numerous theatrical plays. He then moved on to writing and directing documentary shorts. He co-wrote the textbook Producing and Directing the Short Film and Video along with Peter W. Rea. The book is the only text on short film creation to focus on the importance of symbiosis between producer and director. It was originally released in 1995, and is in its 5th edition as of 2019. In 2008, it was announced that he would serve as head of NYU's Tisch Asia graduate film department.

In 2010, Irving wrote another textbook entitled Fundamentals of Film Directing. In 2011, he published another textbook entitled Elements of College Teaching. He served as the chair of New York University's Tisch School of Arts Film and Television program for both the undergraduate and graduate schools for over seven years. He then wrote a novel, Sleep 101: The Odd Rise of Doctor Louise Pond, PhD, which explores the inner workings of academia. This was followed up with Sleep 201: The Further Adventures of Dr. Louise Pond and Sleep 301: Dr. Louise Pond and the Spunky Monkey.

As of 2019, Irving works as an associate professor at NYU's Tisch School of the Arts. In 2007, he received the NYU David Payne Carter Award for Teaching Excellence.

Personal life
In 1974, Irving married actress Susan Burkhalter. They have one daughter, artist Austin Irving.

Filmography

References

External links 

Living people
American film directors
American people of Russian-Jewish descent
American screenwriters
Jewish American screenwriters
Year of birth missing (living people)
21st-century American Jews
People from Santa Clara County, California